Lawrence Casserley (born August 10, 1941 in Little Easton, Essex, England) is a composer, conductor and performer, to real time electro-acoustic music. Lawrence Casserley was professor of electro-acoustic music at the Royal College of Music in London

Early life
Casserley graduated from Kent School in Kent, Connecticut in 1959.

Discography
Solar Wind with Evan Parker, 1997
Work in Progress, 1997
Live at Les Instants Chavires with Evan Parker, Noël Akchoté and Joel Ryan, 1997
Dividuality with Evan Parker and Barry Guy, 1997
Labyrinths, 1997—98
The Evan Parker Electro-Acoustic Ensemble: Drawn Inward (ECM, 1998)
The edge of chaos, 2001
The Evan Parker Electro-Acoustic Ensemble: Memory/Vision (ECM, 2002)
Angelic weaponry, 2003
Iskra³ with Paul Rutherford, 2004
The Evan Parker Electro-Acoustic Ensemble: The Eleventh Hour (ECM, 2004)
Music from Colourdome, 2006
The Evan Parker Electro-Acoustic Ensemble: The Moment's Energy (ECM, 2007)

Compositions

References

External links
Personal Website

1941 births
Living people
Kent School alumni
Musicians from Essex
Academics of the Royal College of Music